Panorama is a line layout and text composition engine to render text in various worldwide languages made by Bitstream Inc. Panorama uses Font Fusion as the base to support rendering of the text. The engine allows the user to manage different text formatting aspects like spacing, alignment, style effects (bold, embossed, outline, drop shadows etc.).

Panorama provides support for OpenType font tables leading to automatic character substitution for ligatures, swashes, scientific figures, etc. Panorama supports three anti-aliasing modes - monochrome, grayscale, and LCD optimized (Horizontal and Vertical).

Version history

Panorama has undergone several changes since its initial release as well as numerous additions of APIs to the core engine.

Features
 Support for Thai shaping and OpenType rules.
 Enhanced support for the Unicode line breaking algorithm.
 Better support for TV screens.
 Enhanced font weight management and formatting support with font ratio, shadow width and shadow color.
 Unicode Compliance  Full layout support for Unicode 5.0 and all international languages including complex scripting languages, such as Arabic, Indic, and Thai.
 Supports bi-directional algorithms required to rearrange characters sequentially. For example in languages such as Arabic, Hebrew, and Urdu the characters may be entered on a keyboard in one way, but need to be rendered in a correct way on a visual device.
 Contextual Shaping  Applies contextual shaping to the characters, i.e., the characters are substituted, combined, or repositioned depending on the rules of the language.
 Composes text in all worldwide languages, which includes various complex scripting languages such as, Arabic, Indic, and Hebrew.
 Supports key OpenType tables required for line layout such as, BASE, glyph definition (GDEF), glyph positioning (GPOS), and glyph substitution (GSUB).
 Supports kerning information in OpenType fonts.
 Text on Path  Enables text rendering along a path, outline, or a predefined shape.
 Font Mapping Supports script-based font mapping enabling the application to support multiple scripts at a single instance.
 Style Mapping  Allows grouping of style-linked fonts to be treated as a single font. The engine "knows" to access a font’s own true-drawn style when you apply styles from the style menu.
 Unicode Mapping  Supports automatic font switching based on the Unicode values of the text stream to be rendered.
 Unicode-Image Mapping  Enables the developers to map a Unicode sequence to any image.
 Paragraph Styling  Supports paragraph-specific formatting attributes including text alignment, letter/line spacing, and indentation functions.
 Termination style  Facilitates the application to include an ellipses kind of termination style  for the truncated text if the string does not fits inside the designated area.
 Inline Images  Supports floating graphic object types that are inline with the text.
 Rich-text Editing features, such as space wrap, tab stops, and dynamic property changes for inter-character space, line indents, and line gaps.
 Supports industry-standard color formats, including monochrome, RGB, and BGR, with alpha channel support.

Font Formats Supported
 Multiple master fonts
 WOFF fonts
 Type 1
 TrueType
 TrueType collections
 OpenType
 Compact font format (CFF)/Type 2
 TrueDoc Portable Font Resources (PFRs)
 Bitstream Speedo
 T2K
 Font Fusion Stroke (FFS)
 Embedded bitmaps (TrueType, TrueDoc, and T2K)
 Windows bitmap font format FNT/FON
 Bitmap Distribution Format (BDF)
 Mac font suitcase (Dfont)

Character Sets Supported

Color Formats Supported
 Supports monochrome and grayscale format.
 Supports industry-standard screen color formats including monochrome, RGB, and BGR.
 Supports eight different pixel depths for R, G, B, and alpha channel in RGB or BGR format.

Text Style and Effects
 Embossed
 Engraved
 Left and right drop shadows
 Algorithmic obliquing
 Algorithmic emboldening
 Underline/Overline/Strikethrough (Single/Double/Dotted line)
 Outlines
 Colored border text styles
 Superscript
 Subscript
 Flicker filter
 User defined filter

Applications/Operating Systems Supported
 Cross-platform applications
 Web (HTML) applications
 Macintosh & Windows
 BREW
 Linux & UNIX
 Embedded operating systems
 Real time operating systems

Devices Supported
Consumer Electronic Devices, Mobile Handset, Set-top box, Digital TV, Printer, Medical Imaging Device, GPS System, Automobile Display, and other Embedded System

See also
 Font Fusion
 Bitstream Inc.

References

External links
 Line layout engine for worldwide text layout, multilanguage, multilingual fonts, and international complex scripts
 2007 Bitstream Press Releases
 Embedded Technology Journal
 BITSTREAM INC 10-K, BITSTREAM INC Annual Report

Layout engines